Obri is a panchayat village in Rajasthan in western India. Administratively it is under Sagwara Tehsil of Dungarpur district, Rajasthan. Obri is the only village in the gram panchayat.

Intro 
Obri is a beautiful village situated in Vaagar area of Rajasthan, surrounded by water on each side.  It is just west of the Moran River. It is a very scenic village and has a major market. It is a major revenue generating village. There is a beautiful kund 'Suryakunda' in the village with Gomukh, wherefrom a continuous flow of water can be seen. Also, a 'Vadikhand temple' of spiritual importance lies at a beautiful location midst of farms outside village.

Infrastructure 
Obri is not connected with any main road, so transportation can be a problem.

Education level 
Obri has around 8–10 schools, including a main Government Senior Secondary school, Government middle school, Holy Faith Public Secondary School and other 5–6 private schools, etc.  Around 76% of Obri's population is educated, in which half of them have graduate level education.  A few people have higher level education,including doctor, CA, engineer, lawyer, computer engineer, policemen etc. Obri Senior school has a record 100% result for five consecutive years in commerce stream. Obri has 17 CA which is highest in Dungarpur.

Economics 
Obri has a good financial status among all Dungarpur villages,with most of its revenues coming from shops around the village. An ample number of people are in Kuwait earning handsome amounts of money. Youngsters either have their own business in Obri itself or are working in Ahmedabad, Mumbai, or nearby cities. Many of the people also generate income by farming.

Demographics
As of the 2011 census there were 1,144 families living in Obri village for a total of 5,243 inhabitants, of which 2,600 were male (49.6%) while 2,643 were female (50.4%).

Religion 
The village has around 12 major Hindu castes and also has a good number of Muslim families and celebrating their festivals joyously.all the festival celebrate all religion together

Festivals 
Obri celebrates a variety of festivals, among which the most famous Hindus festival are Holi, Diwali, Ravadi, Navratri, Dasehra,Janmastami etc.  Futra is one of the major attractions in Obri. It is on the fifth day of Holi Festival and very famous among the ten surrounding villages of Obri. More than ten thousand people have gathered together to watch the Futra festival.

Basic Necessities 
Obri is up to date with most of the required things in the present scenario, including electricity, water, education, all mobile services, broadband, cable, bus and transportation, bank, etc. The only thing Obri does not have is a police station, which in fact is not needed as there is very low crime rate. No doubt Obri has very low crime rate but police station is one of the most requirement.

Nearby villages/towns 
Obri is surrounded by medium and small sized villages including Decha, Virat, Barbodaniya, Aantri, Gada Vejaniya, Piplagunj, Gamda Brahmaniya, Govadi, Colony, Sagwara, Gata Ka Gaon, Favta, Gotad, Khadagda, Ambada, Chadoli, Simalwara,bansiya.
In East - Jhora patali, daiyana, Gotad,Khadagada,Ambada, Urban (Sagwara) etc.
In West - Decha, Favta, Borkhed, etc.
In North - Virat, Biliya Badgama, Antri etc.
In South - PARDA MEHTA, Ghata ka Gaon, Chadoli, Bhemai, Bansiya, Simalwara(Tehsil) etc.
In North-East - Gada vejania, Barbodania, Piplagunj, Gamra Brahmania, Govadi,

References 

Villages in Dungarpur district